Dan Ben-Amos (born September 3, 1934) is a folklorist and professor at the University of Pennsylvania, Philadelphia, where he holds the Graduate Program Chair for the Department of Folklore and Folklife.

Education
Ben-Amos was born in Tel Aviv (then mandatory Palestine) and grew up in Petaḥ-Tikvah. 

Before starting his studies at Hebrew University of Jerusalem, he served in the Nahal Brigade of the Israel Defense Forces, and in the course of his service he was in a unit that guarded the first prime minister of Israel, David Ben-Gurion, until he retired to kibbutz Sde-Boker in the Israeli Desert. Upon discharge he was a member of Kibbutz Yiftaḥ where he was a shepherd. 

At Hebrew University of Jerusalem, he initially majored in Biblical studies and English literature. During his sophomore year, dissatisfied with his academic major, he switched to pursue a degree in Hebrew literature with an interest in folklore, studying with Dov Noy. He received his Bachelor of Arts from Hebrew University of Jerusalem in 1961.

Under advice from Professor Dov Noy at Hebrew University of Jerusalem, Ben-Amos continued his education in the United States at Indiana University Bloomington, which at that time was the only folklore Doctor of Philosophy granting institution in the United States. When he arrived at Bloomington, Indiana, and walked toward the campus, he wondered at the sight of the corn-pipe smoking hoosiers that were swinging on their porches and wondered whether they were his future professors, but when he reached the campus he realized that Bloomington was a university town after all, and (Although originally turned off by the town of Bloomington) he decided to stay, and he received his Master of Arts in 1964 and Doctor of Philosophy in 1967 in folklore. At Hebrew University of Jerusalem and Bloomington, Ben-Amos was trained in the comparatist tradition.

Towards the end of his education and beginning of his career, Ben-Amos, along with other young folklorists, Roger Abrahams, Alan Dundes, Robert Georges, and Kenneth Goldstein, became affectionately labeled "the Young Turks" by Richard Dorson, prominent folklorist and teacher of Ben-Amos. Although Richard Bauman was not originally included in this group, his work has come to be associated with that of the Young Turks; these young folklorists broke with traditional perspectives of folkloristics, which focus on the text and its content. Collectively, they focused on context in an effort to better understand folklore and the way people use folklore. 

Ben-Amos in his influential essay, “Toward a Definition of Folklore in Context,” promoted a new way of defining folklore based on its context. With its focus on context, Ben-Amos's work helped to usher in a new performance based perceptive in the field of folkloristics.

Professional career
Before beginning his Assistant Professorship in Anthropology at the University of California, Los Angeles, which he held from 1966 to 1967, Ben-Amos conducted folklore research in Nigeria on the oral tradition of the Edo people in Benin City and its rural surroundings. He arrived in Nigeria for the first time on January 15, 1966, the day of the first military coup. In 1967, he began teaching at The University of Pennsylvania, Philadelphia, serving as an assistant professor for three years and associate professor for seven. He became Professor of Folklore and Folklife in 1977, holding the title for twenty-two years. His current position at the University of Pennsylvania is Professor of Near Eastern Languages and Civilizations and Folklore, and he serves as Chair of the Graduate Program in Folklore and Folklife.

Ben-Amos's scholarly interests include Jewish folklore, African folklore, humor, the history of folklore, and structural analysis.

Ben-Amos served on the executive board of the American Folklore Society from 1977 to 1980. He was an associate editor from 1981 to 1984 and book editor from 1988 to 1990 of the Journal of American Folklore. He also serves as the general editor to the Indiana Press series Translations in Folklore studies, and since 1996 he has been the editor of the Raphael Patai Series in Jewish Folklore and Anthropology (Wayne State University Press).

Dan Ben-Amos's articles appeared in translation in the following languages: Chinese, Estonian, Finnish, French, German, Hebrew, Italian, Lithuanian, Portuguese, Russian, Spanish, Thai, and Turkish.

Awards
2006 National Jewish Book Award, winner in the Sephardic Culture category for Folktales of the Jews. Volume 1: Tales from the Sephardic Dispersion

2006 National Jewish Book Award, finalist in the Scholarship category for Folktales of the Jews. Volume 1: Tales from the Sephardic Dispersion. Edited with  Commentary (Dov Noy, Consulting Editor). Philadelphia: The Jewish Publication Society, 2006.

2014 American Folklore Society Lifetime Scholarly Achievement Award

Fellowships
1972-1973 American Council for Learned Societies

1975-1976 John Simon Guggenheim Fellowship

1980-1981 National Endowment for the Humanities

Books
In Praise of the Baal Shem Tov, editor and translator, in collaboration with Jerome R. Mintz. Bloomington: Indiana University Press. 1970.
Folklore:  Performance and Communication, ed. in collaboration with Kenneth S. Goldstein. Approaches to Semiotics, 40. The Hague:Mouton Press. 1975.
Sweet Words: Storytelling Events in Benin. Philadelphia: Institute for the Study of Human Issues, 1975.
Folklore Genres, ed. American Folklore Society Bibliographical and Special Series, Volume 26, Texas: University of Texas Press, 1976. (Reprint of 1969a with an 'Introduction' and a "Selected Bibliography")
Folklore in Context: Essays. New Delhi, Madras: South Asian Publishers. 1982.
Cultural Memory and the Construction of Identity, ed. (With Liliane Weissberg), Detroit: Wayne State University Press. (1999).
Folktales of the Jews. Volume 1: Tales from the Sephardic (2006). Volume II: 1970, In Praise of the Baal Shem Tov, editor and translator, in collaboration with Jerome R. Mintz. Bloomington: Indiana University Press. (Paperback edition, 1972. 2nd paperback edition, New York: Schocken, 1984; 3rd edition Northvale, New Jersey: Jason Aronson, Jewish Book Club, Main Selection, January 1994).

References

External links

1934 births
Living people
Jewish folklorists
American folklorists
University of Pennsylvania faculty
Israeli emigrants to the United States
Hebrew University of Jerusalem alumni
Indiana University Bloomington alumni
People from Tel Aviv
People from Petah Tikva
Jewish American academics